Nelson Philippe (born July 23, 1986 in Valence, Drôme) is a French race car driver.

Career

Early career
Philippe raced go-karts from 1998-2002. In 2003, he raced in the Barber Dodge Pro Series, finishing the season with one podium, and four top five finishes.

With just one year of experience in cars, Philippe tested with two Champ Car teams, before signing with Paul Gentilozzi's Rocketsports Racing team. At 17, he became the youngest driver to ever race in Champ Car.

Through the first five races of the 2004 season, Philippe generally stayed out of trouble but usually ran at the back of the pack. Philippe was abruptly dropped from the Rocketsports team before the Molson Indy Toronto. After sitting out several races, Philippe rejoined the series later in the year for Mi-Jack Conquest Racing. In 2005, he continued to race for the Conquest team alongside fellow teenager Andrew Ranger. Philippe made a total of 19 starts for Eric Bachelart's Conquest Racing in 2004 and 2005. Although he struggled with consistency, Phillippe often qualified and ran mid-pack, outpacing the more highly regarded Ranger towards the end of the year. While driving for Conquest in 2005, Philippe was voted by his peers as the Bosch Most Improved Driver in the Series, and won the award in 2006 as well.

Success at CTE-HVM
For the 2006 season, Philippe moved to CTE-HVM Racing and earned his first podium finishes at Milwaukee and Montreal before claiming his first victory at Surfers Paradise. With his victory at Surfers Paradise, Philippe became the youngest winner in Champ Car World Series history, and again being awarded most improved driver in 2006. However, this success was not enough to find Philippe a drive in 2007, whose financial climate stipulated that most drivers had to bring money to the team to race, something Philippe refused to do after his 2006 success.

But on October 3, 2007 it was announced that Nelson Philippe would return to Champ Car and drive for his former team, Conquest Racing. Philippe would race at Surfers Paradise and Mexico City. He said at the time: "I'm thrilled to be back, and no better time than now with Surfers Paradise around the corner [October 21]. It's been a challenge to be sidelined this year, but things happen for a reason and right now it's full steam ahead for Australia and Mexico." Despite having sat out the entire season, Philippe qualified a respectable 13th and then recorded an even more respectable sixth-place finish at Surfers Paradise. "Even though the results may not show it, it was probably one of the best races of my career," said Philippe of the race.

In the season finale at Mexico City, Philippe again qualified 13th, but was one of three cars that stalled at the start. He was able to get the car going and ultimately finished in 12th position, a lap down to the leaders.

After Champ Car
Nelson Philippe returned to race with Minardi/HVM Racing in the 2008 Toyota Grand Prix of Long Beach. This was the final Champ Car World Series race after the merger with the Indy Racing League. He gave tribute to the series that made his career wearing a race suit with past and present Champ Car logos and "Thank you Champ Car staff and fans" inscribed on the back. He finished 15th in the race.

In 2008, Nelson Philippe drove in the inaugural Superleague Formula season for the Borussia Dortmund team. He also competed in the opening round of the 2008–09 GP2 Asia Series season for ART Grand Prix before being replaced by Pastor Maldonado.

Nelson Philippe announced on April 24, 2009 on Fox News that his new "i Drive Green" race team would be fielding the first-ever carbon neutral entry in the Indianapolis 500 in conjunction with HVM Racing. Philippe struggled in practice and qualifying but ultimately made the field. He made light contact with the wall which was enough to end his race on lap 130. He was credited with 25th.

During practice for the 2009 Indy Grand Prix of Sonoma, Nelson Philippe, who was returning to the series for a few late-season road course races with Conquest Racing, spun exiting Turn 3 and stalled on the track. E. J. Viso barely avoided him but Will Power had nowhere to go and crashed into the stationary Frenchman. Power suffered two fractured vertebrae while Philippe suffered a fractured ankle. Both also suffered concussions and were subsequently hospitalized.

Philippe’s younger brother, Richard Philippe, also a racer, died in a helicopter crash in the Dominican Republic in November 2018.

Motorsports career results

American Open-Wheel racing results
(key)

Barber Dodge Pro Series

Champ Car

IndyCar Series

 1 Run on same day.
 2 Non-points-paying, exhibition race.

Indianapolis 500

Superleague Formula
(key)

Complete GP2 Asia Series results

(key) (Races in bold indicate pole position) (Races in italics indicate fastest lap)

References

1986 births
Living people
Sportspeople from Valence, Drôme
Champ Car drivers
French racing drivers
Superleague Formula drivers
IndyCar Series drivers
Indianapolis 500 drivers
GP2 Asia Series drivers
Barber Pro Series drivers
ART Grand Prix drivers
Conquest Racing drivers
Rocketsports Racing drivers
HVM Racing drivers
Starworks Motorsport drivers